Luis Martinetti, Contortionist is an 1894 short film produced by the Edison Manufacturing Company. The film, which runs 12.5 seconds, consists of a contortionist act performed by Luis Martinetti of the Martinetti Brothers trapeze act. Martinetti wears tiger-striped tights and performs contortionist poses on a pair of trapeze rings.

The film was shot on October 11, 1894 at the Edison Black Maria studio in West Orange, New Jersey. 
The film is preserved by the Academy of Motion Picture Arts and Sciences, and was released on the 2000 DVD box set Treasures from American Film Archives, which was compiled by the National Film Preservation Foundation.

Credits
Directed by William K.L. Dickson
Cast: Luis Martinetti as himself
Cinematography by William Heise

References

External links
Luis Martinetti, Contortionist at IMDb
 Luis Martinetti, Contortionist on YouTube
Luis Martinetti, Contortionist at the Library of Congress

1894 films
American silent short films
American black-and-white films
Films directed by William Kennedy Dickson
Gymnastics films
1894 short films
Films shot in New Jersey
1890s American films